Flexxin on Purpose is a mixtape by American rapper Rich the Kid. It was released on August 31, 2015, by Quality Control Music and Rich Forever Music. The mixtape features guest appearances from Young Dolph, Ty Dolla Sign, Fetty Wap and Rich Homie Quan. The mixtape features production by Cassius Jay, Harry Fraud. Hit-Boy, Murda Beatz, OG Parker and Zaytoven.

Track listing

Sample credits
 "Expensive" contains elements of "Everything Is Expensive", written and performed by Esthero.

References

2015 mixtape albums
Rich the Kid albums
Albums produced by Hit-Boy
Albums produced by Zaytoven
Albums produced by Harry Fraud
Albums produced by Murda Beatz